Transtillaspis saragurana is a species of moth of the family Tortricidae. It is found in Loja Province, Ecuador.

The wingspan is about 23 mm.  The ground colour of the forewings is yellowish brown with chestnut admixture, darker basally and terminally. The hindwings are cream, tinged with pale ferruginous on the periphery and spotted with grey.

Etymology
The species name refers to Saraguro, the type locality.

References

Moths described in 2008
Transtillaspis
Taxa named by Józef Razowski